Generation 13 is the eleventh studio album by Saga.

Concept
Generation 13 is a concept album, written by bassist Jim Crichton, which is inspired by the 1993 book 13th Gen: Abort, Retry, Ignore, Fail? by American authors Neil Howe and William Strauss. The book says people born between 1961 and 1981 are America's 13th generaration, with a generation occurring every 20 –25 years from the American Revolution.

Track listing

Personnel

Musicians
 Michael Sadler – lead vocals, pipe organ
 Ian Crichton – guitars
 Jim Gilmour – keyboards, backing vocals, clarinet
 Jim Crichton – bass
 Steve Negus – drums, percussion
 Mary Newland – backing vocals (24)

Players
 Jeremy / Michael Sadler
 Morty / Roger Sommers
 The Father (As a teenager & Mr. Monger) / Michael Sadler
 The Barker (At the carnival) / Steve Negus
 Jeremy's Sister / Penny Crichton
 The Orphanage Master / Michael Sadler
 The "80's" Ghosts / The Goodnight LA-Bv's
 The Amateur Show Host / Michael Sadler
 Sam's New Friend / Christopher Crichton
 Sam (On a good day) / Jim Gilmour
 Sam (On a bad day) / Roger Sommers
 Sarcastic Sam / Jim Crichton
 The Psychiatrist / Roger Sommers
 Java Joe / Jim Crichton

References

1995 albums
Saga (band) albums
SPV/Steamhammer albums
Concept albums